KEGH (107.1 FM) is an American radio station broadcasting a Spanish adult contemporary format. It is licensed to Woodruff, Utah, United States, and owned by Michael V. Call, through licensee Aerostar Communications, LLC.  In February 2009, KEGH was a simulcast of KEGA, The Eagle 101.5, according to the Simmons Media corporate web site.

KEGH has been granted a U.S. Federal Communications Commission construction permit to change the city of license to Woodruff, move to a new transmitter site, move to 107.1 MHz, increase ERP to 89,000 watts and decrease HAAT to 647 meters. This was completed on December 8, 2014, just before switching from the KEGA simulcast to the KALL simulcast. On July 13, 2015, KEGH switched from the KALL simulcast to regional Mexican, branded as "La Raza". On 2016 "La Raza" didn't have the right requirements and it was taken by Broadway Media Llc.

Broadway Media sold the station to MAV Media Llc. KEGH Is now "Placer 107.1FM"

History
The station began operations in 1972 on 107.1 as a class-A in Brigham City as KBUH-FM which calls it had until they obtained a construction permit to upgrade to a Class C station on 106.9 which was completed in around mid-1984.  The station was assigned the call letters KFRZ-FM on September 9, 1984. On October 1, 1985, the station changed its call sign to KSOS and on June 26, 1995, to KLZX-FM. On March 13, 1998, the station became KUUU, and on May 1, 1998, KRAR. Finally on September 13, 2006, the station became KEGH.

In April 2017 KEGH dropped the "La Raza" simulcast and went silent. In August 2017 KEGH returned to the air with Spanish adult contemporary, branded as "Placer 107.1".

In December 2020, The Station was renamed to "La Ley 107.1" While keeping the Spanish Adult Contemporary Format.

Boosters

References

External links

EGH
Brigham City, Utah